The 2014 Temple Owls football team represented Temple University in the 2014 NCAA Division I FBS football season. The Owls were led by second-year head coach Matt Rhule and played their home games at Lincoln Financial Field. They were members of the American Athletic Conference. They finished the season 6–6, 4–4 in AAC play to finish in sixth place. Despite being bowl eligible, Temple was not invited to a bowl game.

Schedule

Schedule Source:

Awards and accomplishments

All Conference Teams
American Athletic Conference First Team: Tyler Matakevich
American Athletic Conference Second Team: Kyle Friend, Praise Martin-Oguike, Matt Ioannidis
American Athletic Conference Honorable Mention: Tavon Young

Players of the Week

American Athletic Conference Defensive Player of the Week:
 
Week 1 - Tavon Young
Week 5 - Praise Martin-Oguike
Week 10 - Praise Martin-Oguike

American Athletic Conference Special Teams Player of the Week:

Week 5 - Austin Jones

National statistical rankings
Scoring Offense: 23.1 points per game (97th nationally)
Scoring Defense: 17.5 points per game (4th nationally)

NFL Players

Undrafted Free Agents

Following the NFL draft, Kenneth Harper signed a contract with the New York Giants.

References

Temple
Temple Owls football seasons
Temple Owls football